IHRA Drag Racing is a racing video game developed by Digital Dialect and published by Bethesda Softworks. It is part of the IHRA Drag Racing series of video games. A Dreamcast version, which was scheduled to release on April 25, 2001, was canceled. The game was released on mobile phones on June 1, 2003.

Development
The game was announced in March 1999. The game was scheduled to release in Q2 2000.

Reception

Stephen Poole of GameSpot reviewed  IHRA Drag Racing for Microsoft Windows and rated it a 5.3 of 10 stating "If you devote a lot of time and patience to the game, there's certainly some fun to be had in IHRA Drag Racing. Unfortunately, because of all the game's problems, it seems likely that not many players will stick with it long enough to enjoy it."

Sales

IHRA Drag Racing sold more than 750,000 copies by March 2003 and over 1 million by November 2003.

References 

2001 video games
Cancelled Dreamcast games
Multiplayer and single-player video games
North America-exclusive video games
PlayStation (console) games
Racing video games
Video games developed in the United States
Video games set in 2001
Vir2L Studios games
Windows games
Digital Dialect games